Cossyphodini is a tribe of darkling beetles in the subfamily Pimeliinae of the family Tenebrionidae. There are about seven genera in Cossyphodini.

Genera
These genera belong to the tribe Cossyphodini
 Cossyphodes Westwood, 1851  (the Palearctic and tropical Africa)
 Cossyphodinus Wasmann, 1899  (tropical Africa and Indomalaya)
 Cossyphodites Brauns, 1901  (tropical Africa)
 Esemephe Steiner, 1980  (the Neotropics)
 Mimocossyphus Pic, 1923  (the Palearctic)
 Paramellon C.O. Waterhouse, 1882  (the Palearctic, tropical Africa, and Indomalaya)
 Paramellops Andreae, 1961  (tropical Africa)

References

Further reading

 
 

Tenebrionoidea